TER Basse-Normandie was the regional rail network serving Lower Normandy, France. In 2016 it was merged into the new TER Normandie. Its network was articulated around the city of Caen.

Trains are operated by the SNCF, services are subject to regulation by the Conseil Régional de Basse Normandie and are promoted using the TER branding. The Conseil Régional has since 2001 received several new multiple diesel-electric units, including single coach, double coach and refurbishment of three car DMUs.

TER Network

Main destinations
Caen
Lisieux
Bayeux
Deauville
Argentan

Rail

Road
Coutances – Granville
Bagnoles-de-l'Orne – Briouze – Argentan

Rolling stock

TER Basse Normandie is operated by an array of rolling stock, including multiple units and both diesel and electric hauled trains:
BB 16500 + RIO
BB 67400 + RIO/Corail
X 4630
X 4900
X 72500
X 73500
AGC

Network

External links
Official site

 
Transport in Normandy
Lower Normandy
Caen
Cherbourg-Octeville
Lisieux